Damasias (Δαμασίας) may refer to:

 Damasias of Amphipolis, Olympic winner in 320 BC
 Damasias, son of Penthilus (son of Orestes)
 Damasias, Archon of Athens 639–638 BC and 582–581 BC

See also
 Damas (disambiguation)